Le Compte, LeCompte or Lecompte may refer to:

People
 Ben LeCompte (born 1993), American college football punter
 Elizabeth LeCompte (born 1944), American director of experimental theater, dance and media
 Herman Le Compte, (1929–2008), Belgian physician
 Joseph Lecompte (1797–1851), American politician
 Karl M. LeCompte (1887–1972), American congressman
 Marie Le Compte, American journal editor and anarchist active during the early 1880s

Other uses
 Lecompte, Louisiana, United States, a town
 Lecompte High School, Lecompte, Louisiana, a former school, now on the National Register of Historic Places
 Le Compte Wildlife Management Area, Dorchester County, Maryland, United States

See also
 Comte (disambiguation)